André Piters (18 January 1931 – 23 October 2014) was a Belgian footballer who played as a striker.

Career
Piters played club football for Herve, Standard Liège, Olympic de Charleroi and Fortuna 54.

He earned a total of 23 caps for Belgium between 1955 and 1961, four of which came in FIFA World Cup qualifying matches.

References

External links

 

1931 births
2014 deaths
Belgian footballers
Belgium international footballers
Standard Liège players
R. Olympic Charleroi Châtelet Farciennes players
Fortuna Sittard players
Association football forwards
Belgian expatriate footballers
Belgian expatriates in the Netherlands
Expatriate footballers in the Netherlands